In Tagalog, bakla mainly refers to male homosexual persons. 

It may also refer to several geographical locations:
 Bəklə, Azerbaijan
 Bakla, Bangladesh
 Bakla, Uttar Pradesh
 Bakla, Vezirköprü, Samsun Province, Turkey